Kaloji Narayana Rao University of Health Sciences (KNRUHS) is a public university in the city of Warangal, Telangana, India. University is named after its poet, and political activist of Telangana – Kaloji Narayana Rao.

History
Before the state bifurcation, all the medical colleges were affiliated to Dr. NTR University of Health Sciences. Post-bifurcation of the state, Government of Telangana established a new university "Kaloji Narayana Rao University of Health Sciences". Prime Minister of India, Narendra Modi formally laid foundation to the university on 7 August 2016. The re-affiliation of Telangana medical colleges with KNRUHS started from June 2016.

Admission and courses
The admission for the convener quota is based on an applicant's NEET (National Eligibility Entrance Test) rank for admission into MBBS and BDS Courses and EAMCET rank for other allied paramedics and pharma courses.

Affiliated colleges

Government Colleges
There are 1250 seats in Government Colleges. Notable colleges include :
 Osmania Medical College, Hyderabad
 Gandhi Medical College, Hyderabad
 Kakatiya Medical College, Warangal
 Rajiv Gandhi Institute of Medical Sciences, Adilabad
 Government Medical College, Nizamabad
 Government Medical College, Mahbubnagar
 Government Medical College, Siddipet

Private Colleges
There are 2250 seats in Private Colleges. Notable colleges include :
  Durgabai Deshmukh College Of Physiotherapy, Hyderabad
 Deccan College of Medical Sciences, Hyderabad
 Shadan Institute of Medical Sciences, Hyderabad
 Kamineni Institute of Medical Sciences, Narketpally
 Maheshwara Medical College and Hospital, Patancheru

References

External links
 

Medical and health sciences universities in India
Education in Warangal
Government universities and colleges in India
Medical colleges in Telangana
2014 establishments in Telangana
Educational institutions established in 2014
State universities in Telangana
Public medical universities